Churwell railway station served the village of Churwell, West Yorkshire, England from 1848 to 1940 on the Huddersfield line.

History 
The station opened on 18 September 1848 by the London and North Western Railway. The station was situated on the embankment southeast of the railway bridge across Elland Road. H. H. Asquith and Sir Charles Scarth, the Mayor of Morley, both met at the station on 16 October 1895 and they both rode up Churwell Hill for the official ceremony of Morley Town Hall. The station was closed to both passengers and goods traffic on 2 December 1940.

References

External links 

Disused railway stations in Leeds
Former London and North Western Railway stations
Railway stations in Great Britain opened in 1848
Railway stations in Great Britain closed in 1940
1848 establishments in England
1964 disestablishments in England